The 1983 Braintree District Council election took place on 5 May 1983 to elect members of Braintree District Council in England. This was on the same day as other local elections.

Summary

Election result

|}

Ward results

Black Notley

Bocking North

Bocking South

Braintree Central

Braintree East

Braintree West

 
 
 

 

No Labour candidates as previous (15.3%, 13.2%).

Bumpstead

Castle Headingham

Coggeshall

Colne Engaine & Greenstead Green

Cressing

 
 

 

No Independent candidate as previous (25.8%).

Earls Colne

Gosfield

Halstead Holy Trinity

Halstead St. Andrew's

 
 

 

No Labour candidates as previous (27.8%, 24.3%).

Hatfield Peverel

Kelvedon

Panfield

Rayne

 

 

No Labour candidate as previous (25.8%).

Sible Headingham

Stour Valley Central

Stour Valley North

Stour Valley South

Terling

Three Fields

Upper Colne

Witham Central

Witham Chipping Hill

Witham North

Witham Silver End & Rivenhall

Witham South

Witham West

 
 
 

 

No Communist candidate as previous (9.6%).

Yeldham

References

Braintree District Council elections
1983 English local elections
May 1983 events in the United Kingdom
1970s in Essex